Bence Horváth (born 12 June 1986, in Miskolc) is a Hungarian football (forward) player who currently plays for Dél-Balaton FC.

Club statistics

Updated to games played as of 1 March 2014.

References 
 
 HLSZ 
 

1986 births
Living people
Sportspeople from Miskolc
Hungarian footballers
Association football forwards
BFC Siófok players
SKN St. Pölten players
Nemzeti Bajnokság I players
Hungarian expatriate footballers
Expatriate footballers in Austria
Hungarian expatriate sportspeople in Austria